Hagby is a locality situated in Kalmar Municipality, Kalmar County, Sweden with 689 inhabitants in 2010. Hagby Church that lies in Hagby is one of only eight medieval round churches in Sweden.

References 

Populated places in Kalmar County
Populated places in Kalmar Municipality